Jib is a triangular sail at the front of a sailing boat.

Jib or JIB may also refer to:

Mechanical
 Jib (crane) or jib arm, the horizontal or near-horizontal beam used in many types of crane
 Jib (camera), a boom device with a camera on one end
 Jib door, a concealed door, whose surface reflects the moldings and finishes of the wall

Businesses and organizations
 Joint Intelligence Bureau, a former British intelligence agency
 Japan International Broadcasting Inc., a Japanese broadcasting organization
 JIB TV, part of NHK General TV, a Japanese television company
 Jong Islamieten Bond, a former Indonesian youth organization 
 Jordan Investment Board, now Jordan Investment Commission, the national investment promotion agency of Jordan

Places
 Hajib, Iran, also known as Jīb, a village in Qazvin Province, Iran
 Al Jib or al-Jib (Arabic: الجيب),  a Palestinian village in the Jerusalem Governorate
 Jib Tunnel, entrance to a cave system in North Yorkshire, England
 Djibouti–Ambouli International Airport, IATA code JIB

Other uses
 Jib, or Grind (sport), a term in winter sports
 Jejunoileal bypass, a surgical weight-loss procedure
 Pongpet Thongklet (born 1995), known as Jib, a Thai footballer
 Plateau United F.C., formerly JIB Strikers F.C., Nigerian football club
 Jib, the character from the board game Candy Land

See also
Gib (disambiguation)
Gibb, a given name and surname
Gibbs (disambiguation)
JIBS (disambiguation)
 Jibbs (born 1990), Jovan Campbell, an American rapper